Nathaniel "Nath" Miller (born September 21, 1979) is a male water polo player from Canada. He won three bronze medals at the Pan American Games with the Canada men's national water polo team during his career.

Playing as a driver Miller was named MVP at the 2002 Commonwealth Water Polo Championships. He won  the 2003 French Elite division championship with the Olympic Nice Club, and the 2006 Brazilian Elite division championship with Fluminense from Rio de Janeiro. Miller has a degree in history from the University of Calgary.

His past positions include a coaching position at Chelsea Piers in Stamford, Connecticut.

Former the head coach and athletic director of the Calgary Renegades Water Polo Club.

References
 Canadian Olympic Committee
 Calgary Renegades Water Polo Club

1979 births
Living people
Anglophone Quebec people
Canadian male water polo players
Olympic water polo players of Canada
Water polo players from Montreal
University of Calgary alumni
Water polo players at the 2008 Summer Olympics
Pan American Games bronze medalists for Canada
Canadian expatriate sportspeople in Brazil
Expatriate sportspeople in Brazil
Canadian expatriate sportspeople in France
Pan American Games medalists in water polo
Water polo players at the 1999 Pan American Games
Water polo players at the 2003 Pan American Games
Water polo players at the 2007 Pan American Games
Medalists at the 1999 Pan American Games
Medalists at the 2003 Pan American Games
Medalists at the 2007 Pan American Games